Greg Miller or Gregory Miller may refer to:

 Greg Miller (animator), American animator
 Greg Miller (Australian footballer) (born 1953), Australian rules footballer
 Greg Miller (baseball), American baseball player
 Gregory Miller (cricketer) (born 1973), South African cricketer
 Greg Miller (footballer, born 1976), Scottish footballer
 Greg Miller (host) (born 1983), American media personality
 Greg Miller (photographer) (born 1967), American photographer
 Greg Miller (poet) (born 1957), American poet
 Gregory A. Miller (born 1962), American politician
 J. Greg Miller, American musician